Ndazola  is an Botswanan traditional dance practiced by Kalanga people. Ndazola is common in the northern parts of Botswana which includes Palapye, Francistown, Mathangwane, Goshwe, Tonota and others.

References

Dance in Botswana